Dominic Ignatius Ekandem  (1917 – 24 November, 1995) was a Nigerian Catholic cardinal who served as Archbishop of Abuja from 1989 until 1992.. He was the first native West African Catholic bishop in history. He also founded the Missionary Society of Saint Paul of Nigeria (M.S.P.).

A native of Akwa Ibom State, Ekandem attended several Catholic seminaries before he became a priest. He was ordained on 7 December 1947, and became the first priest from the old Calabar province. His first assignment as bishop was as auxiliary of Calabar from 1953 to 1963. He was Bishop of Ikot Ekpene from 1963 to 1981; during that tenure, in April 1976, he was named a cardinal. He then became Ecclesiastical Superior of Abuja, and when Abuja became an Archdiocese in 1989, he became its Archbishop (personal title).

Ekandem died in 1995.

References

 Toyin Falola, History of Nigeria

Participants in the Second Vatican Council
Nigerian cardinals
20th-century Roman Catholic bishops in Nigeria
People from Akwa Ibom State
1917 births
1995 deaths
20th-century Roman Catholic archbishops in Nigeria
Cardinals created by Pope Paul VI
Roman Catholic archbishops of Abuja
Roman Catholic bishops of Ikot Ekpene